Allorchestes compressa is a species of amphipod in the family Dogielinotidae. It is found around the coast of Australia from Western Australia to Tasmania and east to Illawarra, New South Wales.

References

Gammaridea
Crustaceans of Australia
Crustaceans described in 1852